The Mandalorian is an American space Western television series created by Jon Favreau for the streaming service Disney+. It is the first live-action series in the Star Wars franchise, beginning five years after the events of Return of the Jedi (1983). Pedro Pascal stars as the title character, a lone bounty hunter who goes on the run after being hired to retrieve "The Child". The first season premiered on Disney+ on its United States launch day, November 12, 2019, and the second season premiered on October 30, 2020.

The series received numerous awards and nominations for its acting, directing, writing, visual effects, and production values. Among these recognitions, it has been nominated for six Primetime Emmy Awards and thirty-three Primetime Creative Arts Emmy Awards (winning fourteen Creative Arts Emmys). The series' first two seasons were nominated for Outstanding Drama Series. At the 2021 ceremony, it tied for most nominations with twenty-four, and it tied for most awards at the Creative Arts ceremony in 2020 with seven wins. Giancarlo Esposito, Timothy Olyphant, Taika Waititi, and Carl Weathers have received Emmy nominations for their performances. Episodes "Chapter 1: The Mandalorian", "Chapter 2: The Child", and "Chapter 16: The Rescue" each won two Emmy awards for their technical achievements.

The Mandalorian has also been nominated for one British Academy Television Award, one Critics' Choice Television Award, one Directors Guild of America Award, one Golden Globe Award, one Grammy Award, three Hugo Awards, three MTV Movie & TV Awards, one Producers Guild of America Award, one ICG Publicists Award (won), one Satellite Award, four Saturn Awards, two TCA Awards, nineteen Visual Effects Society Awards (winning five), and one Writers Guild of America Award, among others. The series was selected by the American Film Institute as one of its top 10 television programs of the year in 2020.

Accolades

Notes

References

External links
 
 

Accolades
Mandalorian